= Jenny Gap, West Virginia =

Jenny Gap
- Unincorporated community
- Location within the state of West Virginia Jenny Gap (the United States)
- Coordinates: 37°43′34″N 81°19′15″W
- Country: United States
- State: West Virginia
- County: Raleigh
- Elevation: 2,139 ft (652 m)
- Time zone: UTC-5 (Eastern (EST))
  - Summer (DST): UTC-4 (EDT)
- GNIS ID: 1742811

Jenny Gap is an unincorporated community in Raleigh County, West Virginia, United States.
